Johannes Große (born 7 January 1997) is a German field hockey player who plays as a defender or midfielder for Rot-Weiss Köln and German national team.

Club career
Große grew up in Berlin and started playing hockey at the Zehlendorfer Wespen when he was three years old. When he was eighteen years old he left them for Club an der Alster. After three seasons in Hamburg he went to Rot-Weiss Köln for the 2018–19 season.

International career
Große made his debut for the senior national team in November 2017 against Great Britain. In November 2018, he was selected in the Germany squad for the 2018 World Cup. He also represented Germany at the 2019 European Championship. On 28 May 2021, he was named in the squads for the 2021 EuroHockey Championship and the 2020 Summer Olympics.

References

External links

1997 births
Living people
German male field hockey players
Male field hockey defenders
Male field hockey midfielders
2018 Men's Hockey World Cup players
Der Club an der Alster players
Rot-Weiss Köln players
Field hockey players at the 2020 Summer Olympics
Olympic field hockey players of Germany
Field hockey players from Berlin
21st-century German people